William H. Ilgenfritz  (born 1946) is an American Anglican bishop. He is married to Lois and the couple has two children and six grandchildren.

He studied at the Trinity School for Ministry, since 1981, and was ordained as an Episcopal priest in 1986. He was the rector of Mount Calvary Church, in Baltimore, Maryland, from 1994 to 2000. He also served as chaplain at St. Jude's Ranch for Children, in Nevada, and was the executive director of the Children's Aid Society.

He has been active in Forward in Faith North America, an Anglo-Catholic group, since 1999. He was nominated to be a bishop by FiFNA Assembly in 2002, with his nomination reaffirmed in 2007, as the Common Cause Partnership was beginning to take shape in the Anglican realignment process that led to the inception of the Anglican Church in North America, in 2009. He was the first bishop consecrated by ACNA on 22 August 2009 by Archbishop Robert Duncan, becoming also the first of the newly created Missionary Diocese of All Saints.

References

External links
William H. Ilgenfritz Biography at Missionary Diocese of All Saints Official Website

1946 births
Living people
Bishops of the Anglican Church in North America
American Anglo-Catholics
Trinity School for Ministry alumni
Anglo-Catholic bishops
Anglican realignment people